Beacon Valley is an ice-free valley between Pyramid Mountain and Beacon Heights, in Victoria Land. It was mapped by the British Antarctic Expedition, 1910–13, and named by the Victoria University of Wellington Antarctic Expedition (VUWAE) (1958–59) after Beacon Heights.

Named features 
Beacon Valley includes several smaller geographic features, named during various scientific surveys.

 Profile Bluff, a prominent cliff (2,070 m) midway between Mount Weller and Horizon Bluff on the west side of the valley. Named in 1993 by the New Zealand Geographic Board (NZGB).
It is west of Friedmann Valley. Named in 1993 by the NZGB.
Rector Ridge, a bold rock ridge at the head of the valley, rising to 2,105 m. It was named in 1992 by Advisory Committee on Antarctic Names (US-ACAN) after Commander Jack Rector, U.S. Navy, Commanding Officer, Antarctic Development Squadron Six (VXE-6), May 1987 to May 1988.
 Vestal Ridge, a steep rock ridge in southeast Beacon Valley, rising to 2,240 m and forming the divide between Mullins Valley and Farnell Valley. It was named by US-ACAN in 1993 after J. Robie Vestal (1942–1992), a microbiologist at the University of Cincinnati whose research in Antarctica focused on adaptations of microbial ecosystems to the extreme environments.

Astrobiological characteristics

The central region of Beacon valley is considered to be one of the best terrestrial analogues for the current conditions on Mars. There is snowdrift and limited melting around the edges and occasionally in the central region, but for the most part, moisture is only found as thin films of brine around permafrost structures. It has slightly alkaline salt rich soil.

References

 

Valleys of Victoria Land
Scott Coast